The Hetman of the Zaporizhian Host was the head of state of the Cossack Hetmanate in what is now Ukraine. The office was disestablished by the Russian government in 1764.

Brief history
The position was established by Bohdan Khmelnytsky during the Cossack Hetmanate in the mid 17th century. During that period the office was electoral. All elections, except for the first one, took place in the Senior Council in Chyhyryn which, until 1669, served as the capital of the Hetmanate.

After the council in Pereyaslav of 1654, several senior cossacks sided with the Tsardom of Russia and, in 1663, they staged the "Black Council" (Chorna Rada) in Nizhyn which elected Ivan Briukhovetsky as an alternative hetman. Since the defeat of Petro Doroshenko in 1669, the title hetman was adapted by pro-Russian elected hetmans who resided in Baturyn. In the course of the Great Northern War one of them, Ivan Mazepa, decided to revolt against Russian rule in 1708, which later drew terrible consequences for the Cossack Hetmanate as well as the Zaporizhian Host. The administration was moved to Hlukhiv where Mazepa was publicly executed in effigy and declared anathema by the Russian Orthodox Church. 

By an edict of the Russian Governing Senate of 17 November 1764, the office was disestablished in the course of the expansion of Russian territory towards the Black Sea coast.

List of hetmans
The list includes only hetmans who belonged to the Cossack Hetmanate. For a full list of all Hetmans of Ukrainian Cossacks, see Hetmans of Ukrainian Cossacks.

Notes 

Some historians, including Mykola Arkas, question the legitimacy of the Teteria's elections, accusing him of corruption. Some sources claim that the election of Teteria took place in January 1663. The election of Teteria led to the Povoloch Regiment Uprising in 1663, followed by greater 

unrest in the modern region of Kirovohrad Oblast, as well as Polesie (all in the Right-bank Ukraine). Moreover, the political crisis that followed the Pushkar–Barabash Uprising divided the Cossack Hetmanate completely on both banks of the Dnieper River. Coincidentally, on 10 January 1663 the Tsardom of Muscovy created the new Little Russian Office (Prikaz) within its Ambassadorial Office.

Vouched for by Charles Marie François Olier, marquis de Nointel, Yuriy Khmelnytsky was freed from Ottoman captivity and, along with Pasha Ibragim, was sent to Ukraine to fight the Moscow forces of Samoilovych and Romadanovsky. In 1681, Mehmed IV appointed George Ducas hetman of Ukraine, replacing Khmelnytsky.

Following the anathema on Mazepa and the election of Ivan Skoropadsky, the Cossack Hetmanate was included in the Russian Government of Kiev in December 1708. Upon the death of Skoropadsky, the elections oh hetmans were discontinued and were awarded as a gift and a type of princely title, first to Moldavian noblemen and, later, to the Russian Empress's favorites.

On 5 April 1710, the council of cossacks, veterans of the battle at Poltava, elected Pylyp Orlyk as the Hetman of Ukraine in exile. Orlyk waged a guerrilla war at the southern borders of the Russian Empire with support from the Ottoman and Swedish empires.

See also
 List of leaders of Ukraine
 Hetmans of Zaporizhian Cossacks
 Hetman of Ukraine

Notes

References

Further reading
 Dyadychenko, V. Sketches of a social and political system of the Left-bank Ukraine at the end of 17th and the start of 18th centuries. Kiev 1959
 Smoliy, V. Hetmanate Ukraine. Kiev 1999

External links
 Shcherbak, V. Institution of Hetmans. Encyclopedia of History of Ukraine. "Naukova dumka". Kiev 2004
 Hetman. Encyclopedia of Ukraine.

Heads of state of Ukraine
17th-century establishments in Ukraine
Presidency of Ukraine
1764 disestablishments in Ukraine
 
Government of the Cossack Hetmanate
1648 establishments in the Polish–Lithuanian Commonwealth